Letters from the Labyrinth is the sixth album by the Trans-Siberian Orchestra. It was released on November 13, 2015. The album is a collection of songs and stories. The stories being a nod to their previous full album Night Castle, using the stories written by the protagonist. The album reached #7 on the Billboard 200 album chart and #1 on the Billboard Top Rock Albums chart. This album was the last for TSO members Paul O'Neill and David Z before their deaths in April and July 2017, respectively.

Critical reception

Awarding the album four stars at CCM Magazine, Matt Conner states, "Indeed, it’s a tall order to educate, enlighten and entertain all at the same time, but TSO effortlessly passes the test, and in the process, turns in one of its most ambitious and gratifying works to date." Kevin Coffey, giving the album two stars out of four from Omaha World-Herald, writes, "It’s amazing and technical playing that’s sure to impress any fan of precise progressive rock. But it’s also a little tedious. All those ever-present solos and precise melodies kind of blend together song after song. And I question why studio recordings would have so many synthesizers replicating strings and grand pianos when surely, with this band as successful as it is, they could have used real musicians. According to the liner notes, they did, but it’s hard to pick out the real players from the synthesized sections. The best performance on the record comes from Halestorm lead singer Lzzy Hale, who sings on a version of “Forget About the Blame.” Unfortunately, her talents are wasted on an extremely repetitive metal ballad. Your enjoyment of this album will probably depend on your overall enjoyment of the band in general...If you dig their rock opera style and hair metal music, you’ll be into this...But don’t buy this looking for another Christmas favorite." Rockavlon awarded the album 4.5 stars out of 10 from Grande-Rock.com, writes, "A half-baked attempt at music theater by stitching together a lot of classical pieces and writing some rather uneventful in between parts to create a semblance of a plot… I’d rather listen to the original classics."

Track listing

Personnel 
 Paul O'Neill - producer
 Dave Wittman - co-producer, recording & mix engineer
 BJ Ramone - assistant engineer
 Jon Tucker - additional assistant engineer
 A&R - Jason Flom, Ryan Silva

Performers

Band
 Paul O'Neill - guitars
 Jon Oliva - keyboards, guitars, bass
 Al Pitrelli - lead/rhythm guitars
 Luci Butler - keyboards
 Chris Caffery - guitars
 Roddy Chong - violin
 Angus Clark - guitars
 Mee Eun Kim - keyboards
 Vitalij Kuprij - keyboards
 Jane Mangini - keyboards
 Derek Weiland - keyboards
 Asha Mevlana - violin
 Johnny Lee Middleton - bass
 John O. Reilly - drums
 Jeff Plate - drums
 David Zablidowsky - bass
 Dave Wittman - additional guitar, bass, drums

Background vocals
 "Forget About the Blame" - Lucille Jacobs, Minnie W. Leonard, Keith Jacobs
 "Who I Am" - Danielle Sample, Erika Jerry, Chloe Lowery, Dari Mahnic, Bart Shatto, Andrew Ross, John Brink, Natalya Piette, Jodi Katz, James Lewis, Georgia Napolitano, Tim Hockenberry
 "Time and Distance (The Dash)" - Danielle Sample, Chloe Lowery, Ava Davis, Kayla Reeves, Adrienne Warren, Andrew Ross, Chris Pinnella, Rob Evan, Parker Sipes, Phillip Brandon, Dustin Brayley, April Berry, Autumn Guzzardi

Strings
 Roddy Chong
 Asha Mevlana
 Lowell Adams
 Nancy Chang
 Lei Liu

Horns
 Jon Tucker (leader)
 Kenneth Brantley
 Jay Coble
 Ashby Wilkins

Charts

Weekly charts

Year-end charts

References

External links 
 Official Site
 Latin Mentor for Trans-Siberian Orchestra: Dr. Clement Kuehn

2015 albums
Trans-Siberian Orchestra albums
Concept albums
Albums produced by Paul O'Neill (rock producer)